The Lamington River, known as the Black River upstream of Pottersville, is a tributary of the North Branch Raritan River in central New Jersey in the United States.

Tributaries
Bamboo Brook
Cold Brook
 Rockaway Creek
Tanners Brook

See also
List of rivers of New Jersey

References

External links
 
 U.S. Geological Survey: NJ stream gaging stations

Tributaries of the Raritan River
Rivers of New Jersey
Rivers of Hunterdon County, New Jersey